Seychelles Islands Foundation (SIF) manages and protects the World Heritage Sites of Aldabra and Vallee de Mai. The foundation was established as a public trust in 1979, with the President of Seychelles as patron. The Board of trustees, appointed by the President, has 14 members, including not less than five representing organizations concerned with the conservation of wildlife and natural history or national academics of science.

Aldabra and Vallee de Mai are both unique, and represent the rich natural heritage of Seychelles. At these sites SIF conserves:

The world's largest raised coral atoll.
The world's largest giant tortoise population.
Some of the world's most spectacular seabird colonies.
The largest intact coco de mer forest and many other endemic trees, plants and animals.
Unique birds, including the last surviving flightless bird of the Indian Ocean, the Aldabra rail, and the endangered Seychelles black parrot.

Nature conservation in Seychelles